Tamaro is a surname. Notable people with the surname include:

Janet Tamaro, American television writer, series creator, executive producer and showrunner
Susanna Tamaro (born 1957), Italian novelist

See also 
Monte Tamaro, is a mountain of the Lugano Prealps, overlooking Lake Maggiore in the Swiss canton of Ticino
Monte Tamaro (ship), is a container ship owned by A.P. Moller Singapore Pte. Ltd. and operated by Maersk Line AS